Grupo Desportivo Vitória de Sernache is the largest sports club in the county of Sertã, portugal

The men's football team played on the Portuguese third tier in the 2020–21 Campeonato de Portugal, staying in the Campeonato de Portugal from 2021 when this became the fourth tier.

References

Football clubs in Portugal
Association football clubs established in 1948
1948 establishments in Portugal